Peter Robert McEnery (born 21 February 1940) is a retired English stage and film actor.

Early life
McEnery was born in Walsall, Staffordshire, to Charles and Ada Mary (née Brinson) McEnery. He was educated at Ellesmere College, Shropshire.

His younger brothers are actor John and the photographer David.

Career
McEnery was notably featured in Victim, a 1961 British neo-noir suspense film directed by Basil Dearden in which McEnery plays Barrett, a young working-class gay man who falls prey to blackmailers after he and the title character are photographed in an intimate embrace [the film's makers claim the older man was merely comforting the younger one who was in tears; the whole premise of the film was that there was no actual intimacy]. McEnery was also recognised for having given Hayley Mills her first grown-up screen kiss in the 1964 film The Moon-Spinners. In 1966 he took the lead in the Disney live action adventure film, The Fighting Prince of Donegal. He played Edwin Clayhanger in the television dramatisation of the novels by Arnold Bennett with support from Janet Suzman, Harry Andrews and Clive Swift.

As an actor for the Royal Shakespeare Company he played the title role in Ron Daniel's 1979 production of Pericles, Prince of Tyre at The Other Place and played several roles in the 1982 epic production of Nicholas Nickleby for the same company. In 1981 he played Oberon in the BBC Television Shakespeare production of A Midsummer Night's Dream. Another notable stage role was that of the surgeon Treves in the National Theatre's 1980 production of The Elephant Man.

Personal life
McEnery married Julie Peasgood in 1978. They met in 1975 when she played a maid called Ada in the Clayhanger television series in which McEnery starred. They later divorced. Their daughter Kate, born in 1981, is also an actress.

Filmography

 Beat Girl (1960) - Tony
 Tunes of Glory (1960) - 2nd Lieutenant David MacKinnon
 Victim (1961) - Jack 'Boy' Barrett
 The Moon-Spinners (1964) - Mark Camford
 The Game Is Over (1966) - Maxime Saccard
 The Fighting Prince of Donegal (1966) - "Red" Hugh O'Donnell
 I Killed Rasputin (1967) - Felix Yusupov
 The Other People (1968) - Peter
 Negatives (1968) - Theo
 Better a Widow (1968) - Tom Proby
 The Adventures of Gerard (1970) - Col. Etienne Gerard (Hussars of Conflans)
 Entertaining Mr Sloane (1970) - Mr Sloane
 Atlantic Wall (1970) - Jeff
 Tales That Witness Madness (1973) - Timothy (segment "Penny Farthing")
 Footprints on the Moon (1975) - Henry
 The Cat and the Canary (1978) - Charlie Wilder
 Lucky Punch (1996) - Flaherty

Television
 The Clayhanger Family (1976) - Edwin Clayhanger
 The Aphrodite Inheritance (1979, TV Mini-Series, BBC) - David Collier
 The Hammer House of Horror (1980, Episode: "The Mark of Satan") - Edwyn
 A Midsummer Night's Dream (1981, TV Movie, Oberon, BBC) - Oberon
 The Mistress (1985, BBC) - Luke #2 (1987)
 The Collectors (1986, BBC) - Harry Caines
 Inspector Morse (1988, ITV) - Donald Phillipson

References

External links

1940 births
Living people
People from Walsall
Actors from Staffordshire
English male film actors
English male television actors
Royal Shakespeare Company members